The Philadelphia Stars are a professional American football team based in Philadelphia, Pennsylvania. The Stars compete in the United States Football League (USFL) as a member club of the league's North division. The team plays its home games at Ford Field in Detroit, Michigan.

Since their formation, the Stars have appeared in the playoffs once, won the division championship game once, and appeared in one USFL Championship Game.

History 
The Philadelphia Stars were one of eight teams that were officially announced as a USFL franchise on The Herd with Colin Cowherd on November 22, 2021. On January 6, 2022, It was announced on The Herd with Colin Cowherd that former CFL Head coach Bart Andrus was named the Head coach and General manager of the Stars. Andrus later announced most of his staff on January 28, 2022 on the Dan Sileo Show.

During the 2022 USFL Draft, the Stars selected quarterback Bryan Scott with the 3rd overall pick, and selected highly touted cornberback, Channing Stribling.

After training camp, Scott was officially named the Stars' starting quarterback for the 2022 season by head coach Andrus. After starting the season 2–3, the Stars went 4–1 in their last five games, clinching a playoff berth in week 8 after a victory over the Michigan Panthers. They went on to beat the New Jersey Generals 19–14 in the North Division Championship game, earning them their first USFL Championship Game appearance. However, despite erasing a halftime 11-point deficit, they ultimately lost on a late touchdown to the Birmingham Stallions, 33–30.

Championships

North Division championships

Mascot 

On April 11, 2022, the Stars unveiled their mascot, a monstrous red creature that drew comparisons to other Philadelphia sports mascots Gritty and the Phillie Phanatic. The Stars then held a Twitter poll asking fans whether the mascot should be named "Astro", "Cosmo", or "Blob". "Blob" took 65 percent of the vote, and the name was confirmed on April 15. The Stars have offered few details about Blob besides describing him as "out of this world" and noting that he enjoys dancing.

Personnel

Staff

Current roster 
Initially, each team carried a 38-man active roster and a 7-man practice squad, but the rosters were increased to 40 active players and 50 total in May, 2022.

Statistics and records

Season-by-season record

Note: The Finish, Wins, Losses, and Ties columns list regular season results and exclude any postseason play.

Records

References

2021 establishments in Alabama
American football teams established in 2021
Philadelphia Stars (2022)
American football teams in Philadelphia
United States Football League (2022) teams